Susan Williams Gifford (born November 3, 1959) is a Republican member of the Massachusetts House of Representatives.  She has represented the Second Plymouth since 2003.

Early life and education
Gifford graduated from St. Joseph High School, St. Joseph, Michigan and later from Western Michigan University, with her Bachelor of Arts degree in 1982.

Gifford was a Claims Consultant for Insurance Overload Systems from 2000-2002.  She served as a Selectman for the town of Wareham from 1999-2002.

Memberships
Gifford is a member of the Wareham Land Trust, Buzzards Bay Village Association, Onset Bay Village Association, Barnstable County Republican Club, Cape Cod Republican Club, Plymouth County Republican Club, Wareham Republican Town Committee, Caucus of Women Legislators, and the Manufactured Home Commission.

Committee assignments
 House Committee on Steering, Policy and Scheduling
 Joint Committee on Environment, Natural Resources and Agriculture
 Joint Committee on Financial Services
 Joint Committee on Health Care Financing
 Joint Committee on Tourism, Arts and Cultural Development

Elections

2010

Gifford won re-election to the Second Plymouth Seat in 2010.  She had no primary opposition.  She defeated David Smith (D) in the general election on November 2, 2010.

Massachusetts House of Representatives elections, 2010:
 Susan Williams Gifford (R) (inc.) - 10,398 (62.73%)
 David A. Smith (D) - 5,331 (32.16%)

2008
Gifford won re-election to the Second Plymouth Seat on November 4, 2008.  She had no primary opposition and she ran unopposed in the general election.  She defeated David Smith (D) in the general election on November 4, 2008.

Massachusetts House of Representatives elections, 2008:
 Susan Williams Gifford (R) (inc.) - 16,211 (73.58%)
 Blanks - 5,590 (25.37%)
 All others - 230 (.01%)

See also
 2019–2020 Massachusetts legislature
 2021–2022 Massachusetts legislature

References

External links
 Massachusetts House of Representatives - Rep. Susan Gifford
 Project Vote Smart profile
 Susan Gifford's personal website

1959 births
Western Michigan University alumni
Republican Party members of the Massachusetts House of Representatives
People from Wareham, Massachusetts
Living people
Women state legislators in Massachusetts
21st-century American politicians
21st-century American women politicians